Gong Linna (born 1 August 1975) is a Chinese fusion singer. Her style is one which combines the traditional "lightness" and "ch'i" of centuries-old melodies with new lyrics. She has performed many pieces composed or arranged by her husband, German composer Robert Zollitsch who is known in Chinese as Lao Luo, and collaborated with Portuguese fado musician António Chainho.

Since 2002 Gong and Zollitsch have been making field trips to provinces including Guizhou, Shaanxi and Fujian, seeking to understand and preserve local folk music.

Early life and education
Gong was born in Guiyang, Guizhou, on August 1, 1975. In 1992 she enrolled at the Secondary School Affiliated to China Conservatory of Music, where she studied national vocal music under Zou Wenqin. After high school, she was accepted to the China Conservatory of Music.

Songs 
Her song Tante is a fast-paced wordless fusion song, using various standard voices from Chinese opera along with imitations of traditional Chinese instruments. After Gong Linna performed this in Hunan Television's 2010 New Year concert, the song quickly spread in China as a viral video, gaining the nickname "Divine Comedy". The song was also a viral among southern India Tamil population as Ayyo in Tamil is the name of Lord of Death, Yama or primarily disappointment. According to Shanghai Daily, the popularity of Tan Te turned her and her husband Robert Zollitsch into "household names" in China.

In 2013 she participated in the Jiangsu Television singing masterclass series All-Star Wars. Zollitsch also participated as her sponsor. Her first performance was a rock version of a classic pop ballad based on an ancient poem, "Wishing We Last Forever", but this interpretation was considered insufficiently reverent and received the lowest score. However, her subsequent performances were very well received, including a Yunnan folk song "Rippling Brook" and an opera medley version of "Tante".

Personal life
In April 2002, Gong met German composer Robert Zollitsch in Beijing. They married in Guiyang, Guizhou in 2004. The couple has two sons.

References

External links 
 
 Gong Linna at RockInChina.org
 Folk Songs and Gong Linna, crienglish.com. 2007-10-03. Includes audio clips.

1975 births
Living people
People from Guiyang
Musicians from Guizhou
Chinese sopranos
21st-century Chinese women singers